The German School Shanghai (DSSH) is a private school in Shanghai, with locations in Hongqiao (DSSH) and Yangpu (DSSY).

It was established in 1995 for expatriate German pupils. With approximately 1,250 pupils the school is the largest German School in China one of and the largest of its kind worldwide.

Academics are based on education in Germany, finishing with the Abitur.

The school contains:
Kindergarten
one-year preschool
four-year elementary school (Grundschule)
eight-year secondary school (Hauptschule, Realschule and Gymnasium)

The German School Shanghai and the French School of Shanghai (LFS) built a new combined Eurocampus for their students in Hongqiao, completed in 2005. 

In September 2007 the Pudong Campus was opened, which is a branch of the DSS. In January 2020 the Pudong school community moved to a newbuilt Campus in Yangpu, the second Eurocampus in Shanghai.

See also 
List of international schools in Shanghai
List of international schools
Shanghai
Qingpu District, Shanghai
Pudong

References

External links 

 German School Shanghai

International schools in Shanghai
German international schools in China
1995 establishments in China
Educational institutions established in 1995
Schools in Pudong
Qingpu District